Simeon Griswold (May 16, 1752 – December 7, 1843) was a Massachusetts Representative from Pittsfield, Massachusetts and a member of the political Griswold Family.

Early life
Griswold was born in Bolton, Connecticut on May 16, 1752.  He was one of three children born to Seth Griswold (1723–1810) and Susanna (née Shurtleff) Griswold (1732–1757), who married in 1751 in Bolton.

His paternal grandparents were Daniel Griswold and Sarah (née White) Griswold. His maternal grandparents were John Shurtleff and Sarah Carver Lucas (herself the daughter of Benoni Lucas and Repentance Harlow).

Career
At the age of 22, he volunteered to serve in the Connecticut Line during the American Revolution, after which he moved to Pittsfield and opened the Pittsfield Hotel as a meeting a lodging place for members of opposing political parties.

Public office
Griswold was elected to the Massachusetts State Legislature from the town of Pittsfield five times, serving from 1805–1807, 1809, 1814. Griswold died in Nassau, New York.

Personal life
On May 7, 1778, Griswold was married to Ann Hutchinson (1755–1836). Together, they were the parents of:

 Justin Griswold (1779–1841)
 Chester Griswold (1781–1860), a New York representative who married Abby Moulton, daughter of Howard and Mary (née White) Moulton of Troy, on June 23, 1813.

He died on December 7, 1843 in Nassau, New York.

Descendants
Through his son Chester, he was the grandfather of U.S. Congressman John Augustus Griswold (1818–1872).

References

1752 births
1843 deaths
Politicians from Pittsfield, Massachusetts
Members of the Massachusetts House of Representatives
People from Bolton, Connecticut
People of Connecticut in the American Revolution
People of colonial Connecticut
Griswold family